"Toujours debout" is a song by Renaud released in 2016.

Charts

References

2016 singles
2016 songs
French-language songs
SNEP Top Singles number-one singles
Songs written by Renaud